Dacait is a  1987 Indian film directed by Rahul Rawail. The movie stars Sunny Deol, Meenakshi Sheshadri, Raakhee and Raza Murad. It is based on how a simple-living guy transforms into a dacoit after being oppressed by the Zamindars of the area.  The plot is based in the Chambal area, which is the confluence of three states, UP, MP and Rajasthan and has been ignored for development since independence.

Cast 
Raakhee as Devi Chaudhrain 
Sunny Deol as Arjun Yadav
Meenakshi Sheshadri as Chavli 
Suresh Oberoi as Amritlal Yadav 
Raza Murad as Thakur Bhanwar Singh 
Paresh Rawal as Thanedar Vishnu Pandey
Shafi Inamdar as S. P. Shrivastav
Satyajeet Puri as Ahmed 
Urmila Matondkar as Shanta Yadav
Harish Patel as Tolaram
Dan Dhanoa as Thakur Badri Singh (Bhanwar Singh's Brother)
Dilshad as Amritlal's Wife
Anita Kanwar as Dr. Geeta
A. K. Hangal as Bhiku Chacha

Soundtrack
Lyrics: Anand Bakshi

External links
 

1987 films
1980s Hindi-language films
Films directed by Rahul Rawail
Films scored by R. D. Burman
1980s action drama films
Indian action drama films
Indian films about revenge